Praseodymium(V) oxide nitride is a compound of praseodymium in the oxidation state of +5 with the formula PrNO, which was first reported in 2000, however, the compound wasn't verified to have an oxidation state of +5 until 2017. This compound is produced by the reaction of praseodymium metal and nitric oxide in 4K and solid neon. The crystal structure is linear with the praseodymium forming a triple bond with the nitrogen and a double bond with the oxygen. Calculation shows a significant level of f-orbital covalence of Pr-X bonds.

Reactions
Praseodymium(V) oxide nitride further reacts with nitric oxide to form complexes such as NPrO(NO) and NPrO(NO)2 which shows that this compound is a lewis acid. This compound also decomposes to praseodymium(IV) oxide and nitrogen:
PrNO → PrO2 + N2

References

Praseodymium compounds
Nitrides
Oxides